Burwell Tramway was a  standard gauge industrial tramway which ran from the Ely-Newmarket line, just south of the Soham-Wicken A1123 road, to industries just north of Burwell Lode. As well as serving Fisons chemical (fertilizer) works, the line also served the adjacent Burwell Brick Company brickworks, a cement works, and local fruit growers and farmers.

History 
The line was in existence by 1900 and was closed in 1971.

Fruit Tramway 
An Ordnance Survey map from the 1920s shows an agricultural tramway feeder, possibly narrow gauge from the cartographic representation, running west across Little Fen parallel to and south of New River through an area of orchards.

Locomotives
  Planet 4-wheel diesel-mechanical locomotive no. FH3887 at work c. 1959, photograph reference IND330, IND579

References

 Industrial Locomotives of East Anglia by C.Fisher, published by the Industrial Railway Society
 Ordnance Survey map: 7th Edition, sheet 135, Cambridge & Ely, revised 1950, published 1954
 Forgotten Railways: Vol 7 East Anglia by R.S.Joby, published by David St John Thomas (map, p. 102)

Rail transport in Cambridgeshire